Mario Casariego y Acevedo, CRS (13 February 1909 – 15 June 1983) was a Spanish-born Guatemalan Cardinal of the Roman Catholic Church. He served as Archbishop of Guatemala City from 1964 until his death, and was elevated to the cardinalate in 1969.

Biography
Mario Casariego y Acevedo was born in Castropol to Mario and Ágata (née Acevedo) Casariego. He entered the Clerics Regular of Somasca, more commonly known as the Somascan Fathers, in 1924, and made his profession on 3 October 1930. Casariego studied at the Somascan houses of studies in Bergamo and Genoa, and at the Somascan theological seminary in San Salvador.

He was ordained to the priesthood on 19 July 1936, and then did pastoral work at La Ceiba Institute in San Salvador until 1948, whence he became its rector. From 1954 to 1957, Casariego served as a counselor to his religious order. He was also its provincial superior of Central America from 1957 to 1958.

On 15 November 1958, Casariego was appointed Auxiliary Bishop of Guatemala City and Titular Bishop of Pudentiana by Pope Pius XII. He received his episcopal consecration on the following 27 December from Pope John himself, with Bishops Girolamo Bortignon, OFM Cap, and Gioacchino Muccin serving as co-consecrators, in St. Peter's Basilica. Casariego later attended the Second Vatican Council from 1962 to 1965, during which he was promoted to Coadjutor Archbishop of Guatemala City and Titular Archbishop of Perge on 22 September 1963. He succeeded the late Mariano Rossell y Arellano as Archbishop of Guatemala City on 12 December 1964. Casariego was kidnapped for several days by a terrorist group (right extremists from a death squad who wanted to blame Guatemalan leftist guerrilla) in March 1968.

Pope Paul VI created him Cardinal Priest of S. Maria in Aquiro in the consistory of 28 April 1969; Casariego was the first cardinal from Guatemala. He was one of the cardinal electors who participated in the conclaves of August and October 1978, which selected Popes John Paul I and John Paul II respectively.

The Cardinal was an ardent supporter of Guatemala's authoritarian regime, so much so that his automobile was accompanied by a radio patrol and two armed motorcycle guards. In response to the murder of many politically active priests, Casariego said he knew of no murdered clergy in his country, where most accounts claimed there had been at least ten. Moreover, he also stated, "If you mix in politics, you get what you deserve."

Cardinal Casariego died in Guatemala City, at the age of 74. He is buried in the metropolitan cathedral of the same.

References

External links
Catholic-Hierarchy
Cardinals of the Holy Roman Church

1909 births
1983 deaths
People from Asturias
Guatemalan cardinals
20th-century Roman Catholic archbishops in Guatemala
Participants in the Second Vatican Council
Cardinals created by Pope Paul VI
People from Guatemala City
Roman Catholic archbishops of Guatemala (1743-2013)